Adam Cracknell (born July 15, 1985) is a Canadian professional ice hockey right winger who is currently playing with the Tucson Roadrunners in the American Hockey League (AHL)

Playing career

Junior
Cracknell played junior hockey for the Kootenay Ice in the Western Hockey League (WHL) between 2002 and 2006. Following his second season with the club, he was selected in the ninth round (279th overall) by the Calgary Flames during the 2004 NHL Entry Draft. As a member of the 2004–05 team, the Ice won the league's regular season championship. During the 2005–06 season, Cracknell led the team in goals (42), assists (51), and points (93); finished second in the WHL in total points; and was named to the WHL West Second All-Star Team.

Professional
Calgary Flames and St. Louis Blues
Cracknell spent his first three professional seasons with the Flames' minor league affiliates, skating with the Las Vegas Wranglers of the East Coast Hockey League (ECHL) and the Quad City Flames of the American Hockey League (AHL). However, he never appeared in a game for the club. On July 16, 2009, Cracknell signed a one-year contract with the St. Louis Blues.

Cracknell spent the majority of the 2011 season playing for the Blues affiliate, the Peoria Rivermen of the American Hockey League. The Blues recalled him on March 1, 2011, and on March 12, Cracknell scored his first NHL goal in a game against the Detroit Red Wings. On April 17, 2014, Cracknell scored his first Stanley Cup Playoff goal in Game 1 of the Western Conference Quarter Finals against the Chicago Blackhawks, a series the Blues lost in six games.

Los Angeles Kings and Columbus Blue Jackets
On July 1, 2014, Cracknell signed a one-year deal as a free agent with the defending Stanley Cup champion Los Angeles Kings.  However, during training camp Cracknell failed to impress the Kings, who placed him on waivers. The Columbus Blue Jackets claimed him on October 7. Cracknell appeared in 17 games for the Blue Jackets, recording one assist. Cracknell also appeared in 18 games for the Blue Jackets AHL affiliate, the Springfield Falcons, and recorded three goals and seven points.

Return to St. Louis
On February 26, 2015, Cracknell was reacquired by the Blues in exchange for future considerations. Cracknell spent the remainder of the season with the Wolves.

Vancouver Canucks and Edmonton Oilers
On August 25, 2015, the Vancouver Canucks signed Cracknell as a free agent to a one-year, two-way contract. Expected to begin the year with the Utica Comets, Cracknell impressed at training camp and was named to the Canucks' opening night roster for the 2015–16 season. On October 12, 2015, he scored his first goal for the Canucks. Cracknell appeared in a career-high 44 games in Vancouver before he was placed on waivers and claimed by the Edmonton Oilers on February 29, 2016.

Dallas Stars
On July 3, 2016, Cracknell moved again, signing as a free agent with the Dallas Stars on a one-year, two-way contract. In his first game with the Stars, Cracknell recorded 2 points with a goal and an assist. On March 24, 2017, Cracknell scored his first career hat trick in a 6–1 win against the San Jose Sharks.

New York Rangers
Cracknell played in single game with the Stars to start the 2017–18 season before he was placed on waivers. On October 9, 2017, his tenure with the Stars ended as the New York Rangers claimed Cracknell off waivers. After playing four games with the Rangers, Cracknell was placed on waivers on October 24 and later reassigned to AHL affiliate, the Hartford Wolf Pack.

Montreal Canadiens
Cracknell appeared in 15 games with the Wolf Pack before he was traded to the Montreal Canadiens in exchange for Peter Holland on November 30, 2017. Cracknell was immediately assigned to the Canadiens' AHL affiliate, the Laval Rocket and played out the remainder of the season, contributing with 27 goals and 48 points in 52 games.

Toronto Maple Leafs and Anaheim Ducks
On July 1, 2018, Cracknell as a free agent, agreed to a one-year, $650,000 contract with the Toronto Maple Leafs. In the ensuing 2018–19 season, Cracknell appeared in 14 games and posted 10 points with AHL affiliate, the Toronto Marlies before the Maple Leafs traded him to the Anaheim Ducks in exchange for Steven Oleksy on December 10, 2018.

Kunlun Red Star
After spending his first 13 professional seasons in North America, Cracknell left the NHL and signed his first contract abroad by agreeing to a one-year contract with Chinese club Kunlun Red Star of the KHL on July 4, 2019.

Return to Edmonton
On September 10, 2020, Cracknell returned to North America and the Oilers' organization, signing a one-year, two-way contract.  Assigned to the Oilers AHL affiliate, the Bakersfield Condors for the pandemic delayed 2020-21 season, Cracknell appeared in all 39 regular season games posting 11 goals and 19 assists for 30 points, placing third on the team in scoring. He helped the Condors claim the Pacific Division title in a playoff format by leading the club with 10 points in six postseason games.

As an impending unrestricted free agent, Cracknell opted to remain within the Oilers organization, agreeing to a one-year AHL contract to continue with the Condors on June 2, 2021.

Tucson Roadrunners
Following two seasons with the Condors, Cracknell left as a free agent and was signed to a one-year AHL contract with the Tucson Roadrunners, a primary affiliate of the Arizona Coyotes, on July 26, 2022.

International play
In January 2022, Cracknell was selected to play for Team Canada at the 2022 Winter Olympics.

Career statistics

Regular season and playoffs

International

Awards and honours

References

External links
 
 
 
 

1985 births
Living people
Anaheim Ducks players
Bakersfield Condors players
Calgary Flames draft picks
Canadian ice hockey right wingers
Chicago Wolves players
Columbus Blue Jackets players
Dallas Stars players
Edmonton Oilers players
Hartford Wolf Pack players
Ice hockey people from Saskatchewan
Kootenay Ice players
HC Kunlun Red Star players
Las Vegas Wranglers players
Laval Rocket players
New York Rangers players
Ice hockey players at the 2022 Winter Olympics
Olympic ice hockey players of Canada
Omaha Ak-Sar-Ben Knights players
Peoria Rivermen (AHL) players
Quad City Flames players
St. Louis Blues players
San Diego Gulls (AHL) players
Sportspeople from Prince Albert, Saskatchewan
Springfield Falcons players
Toronto Marlies players
Tucson Roadrunners players
Vancouver Canucks players